NumWorks is a technology company that designs, develops, and sells graphing calculators. Their calculators are source-available and have their hardware design available under a Creative Commons license. Its first calculator, the N0100, was released on August 29, 2017 in Europe and the United States and is geared towards high school classrooms and students. The calculators use Python as their programming language, rather than a proprietary language (e.g. TI-BASIC used by Texas Instruments calculators).

Development 
Romain Goyet, the CEO of NumWorks, started the company in 2016. Before starting NumWorks, he was a software engineer at Apple who also contributed to open-source projects such as Linux.

Products 
The NumWorks graphing calculator was the first graphing calculator to be programmable using the Python language. It features a 320x240 IPS display with a 2.8″ diagonal. Internally, it is powered by a 216 MHz Cortex-M7 processor and 8 MB of Quad-SPI Flash memory. The calculator has a 1450 mAh lithium polymer battery. The calculator weights  and measures .

Features 
The calculator was specifically designed to be modded using 3D printing. 3D models, schematics, and board layout details are available to the public under a Creative Commons license. The software on the calculator is updated on a monthly cycle. Updates can be downloaded to the calculator from its website using WebUSB or by building the operating system from its direct source.

The NumWorks calculator also includes an "exam mode" which removes all Python programs, resets all apps, and disables certain features. It can be disabled by plugging the calculator into a power source and selecting disable on the popup that appears.

On March 22, 2019, NumWorks released an app for iOS and Android. It features the same functionality as the physical calculator except it does not have data persistence.

References

External links 
 NumWorks official site
 

Products introduced in 2017
Graphing calculators
Programmable calculators